The 1908 Argentine Primera División was the 17th season of top-flight football in Argentina. The season began on April 26 and ended on November. The championship was reduced from 11 to 10 teams, with each team playing the other twice.

Belgrano Athletic won its 3rd. title, ending a run of three consecutive league championships for Alumni.

Final standings

References

Argentine Primera División seasons
1908 in Argentine football
1908 in South American football